Shifty may refer to:


Music
 Shifty, a 2012 EP by Cassie Steele
 Shifty Records, a former South African anti-apartheid record label
 Shifty Records (United States), an American record label specializing in metal

People
 Shifty Henry, American musician John Henry (1921–1958)
 Darrell Powers (1923–2009), American non-commissioned officer in World War II, nicknamed "Shifty"
 Shifty Shellshock, stage name of American nu metal/hip hop singer Seth Binzer (born 1974), co-founder and co-leader of the band Crazy Town
 Jim West (baseball) (1911–1970), American Negro league first baseman nicknamed "Shifty Jim"

Fictional characters
 Shifty, a fictional character in the series Happy Tree Friends
 Shifty Dingo, a fictional character in the series The Adventures of Blinky Bill
 Cousin Shifty, a fictional character in the series Bread

Other uses
 Shifty (film), a 2008 British urban thriller, from writer/director Eran Creevy

Lists of people by nickname